Václav Syrový (11 June 1934 – 25 March 2010) was a Czech weightlifter. He competed in the men's heavyweight event at the 1960 Summer Olympics.

References

1934 births
2010 deaths
Czech male weightlifters
Olympic weightlifters of Czechoslovakia
Weightlifters at the 1960 Summer Olympics
Sportspeople from Prague